Ripabianca is a  of the  of Deruta in the Province of Perugia, Umbria, central Italy. It stands at an elevation of 230 metres above sea level. At the time of the Istat census of 2001 it had 488 inhabitants.

Famous for Matteuccia Di Francesco, the first woman to be sentenced to Witch trials in Europe.

References 

Frazioni of the Province of Perugia